Kōhaku is a Japanese word that can mean one of several things depending on the Kanji used.

Examples:
紅白: means "red and white."
黄白: means "gold and silver" or "yellow and white."

Kōhaku (紅白) may refer to:

 Kōhaku maku, a red and white decorative banner used in Japan
 Kōhaku (fish), a variety of koi
 Kōhaku Uta Gassen, an NHK music show broadcast every New Year's Eve

People 
 Kouhaku Kuroboshi (born 1974), Japanese illustrator

See also 
 Kohaku (disambiguation) (琥珀), amber
 Red and White (disambiguation)

ja:紅白